Michael J. Carey may refer to:

 Michael Carey (United States Air Force officer), American entrepreneur and officer
 Michael J. Carey (computer scientist), American computer scientist